East Fork Trinity River may refer to:

East Fork Trinity River (California)
East Fork Trinity River (Texas)